Barile may refer to:

 Barile, a town and comune in the province of Potenza, in the Southern Italian region of Basilicata
 Xavier J. Barile (1891–1981), Italian-born American artist
 Al Barile, American songwriter/guitarist and co-founder of SSD (Society System Decontrol), a Boston-based band
 Albert Barillé (1920–2009), French television producer, creator, screenwriter, cartoonist, and founder of Procidis